The 2018 Russian Super Cup was the 16th annual Russian Super Cup match which was contested between the 2017–18 Russian Premier League champion, Lokomotiv Moscow, and the 2017–18 Russian Premier League runner-up, CSKA Moscow. 2017–18 Russian Cup winner FC Tosno was dissolved in the summer 2018 and was replaced by CSKA in the game.

CSKA Moscow won in extra time.

Match details

References

Russian Super Cup
Super Cup
FC Lokomotiv Moscow matches
PFC CSKA Moscow matches